Phillip "Phil" Di Giuseppe (born October 9, 1993) is a Canadian professional ice hockey forward for the Vancouver Canucks of the National Hockey League (NHL). He was drafted 38th overall by the Carolina Hurricanes in the 2012 NHL Entry Draft.

Playing career
Di Giuseppe played his amateur hockey with the Villanova Knights in the Ontario Junior Hockey League. He committed to play collegiate hockey with the University of Michigan of the Central Collegiate Hockey Association. Following his freshman season, Di Giuseppe was selected in the second round by the Carolina Hurricanes in the 2012 NHL Entry Draft. He returned to Michigan for his sophomore season in 2012–13, where he set a personal best 28 points in 40 games with Michigan. In his junior season, Di Giuseppe ranked second among Wolverines in goals with 13 in 35 games.

Having played 115 games with the Wolverines, Di Giuseppe opted to forgo his final year of eligibility, signing a three-year, entry-level contract with the Hurricanes on March 26, 2014. He was signed to an amateur try-out contract by the Hurricanes' American Hockey League (AHL) affiliate, the Charlotte Checkers, recording one assist in three games to conclude 2013–14 regular season.

Di Giuseppe began the 2015–16 season with the Checkers. On December 4, 2015, Di Giuseppe received his first NHL recall by the Hurricanes. The following day he made his NHL debut in a 3-2 victory over the Montreal Canadiens.

On July 27, 2017, the Hurricanes re-signed Di Giuseppe to a one-year, two-way contract worth $725,000.

On January 1, 2019, Di Giuseppe was claimed on waivers by the Nashville Predators. He appeared in three games for the Predators, while also playing in 24 games for their AHL affiliate, the Milwaukee Admirals.

On July 18, 2019, Di Giuseppe signed a one-year, two-way contract with the New York Rangers.

On July 28, 2021, Di Giuseppe signed a one-year, two-way contract with the Vancouver Canucks.

Career statistics

References

External links
 

1993 births
Living people
Abbotsford Canucks players
Canadian ice hockey left wingers
Carolina Hurricanes draft picks
Carolina Hurricanes players
Charlotte Checkers (2010–) players
Hartford Wolf Pack players
Michigan Wolverines men's ice hockey players
Milwaukee Admirals players
Nashville Predators players
New York Rangers players
Vancouver Canucks players